John Parker Pelloe (31 May 1905 – 23 March 1983) was Archdeacon of Wisbech from 1953 to 1964; and an Honorary Chaplain to the Queen from 1964 to 1975.

 
Pelloe was educated at Charterhouse and The Queen's College, Oxford and was in business from 1922 to 1932. He was ordained in 1936; and served curacies in Sunderland and Kensington. After this he was Domestic Chaplain to the Bishop of Ely from 1942 to 1946. He was Vicar of Wisbech from 1946 to 1960, and its Rural Dean from 1946 to 1953. He was Vicar of Stuntney from 1960 to 1968. He was made an Honorary canon of Ely Cathedral in 1952.

Notes 

1905 births
People educated at Charterhouse School
Alumni of The Queen's College, Oxford
Archdeacons of Wisbech
Honorary Chaplains to the Queen
1983 deaths